Sebastian Białas (born January 7, 1990) is a Polish footballer who currently plays as a defender for Arka Gdynia in the Ekstraklasa.

International career 
Sebastian Białas has made the international debut, in August, 2007. At present is the player of a Poland U-19 team. Earlier it was caused in youth national team Poland U-18s.

External links 
 

1990 births
Living people
Polish footballers
Arka Gdynia players
Sportspeople from Bielsko-Biała
Association football defenders